The play-offs of the 2020–21 Billie Jean King Cup Asia/Oceania Zone Group II were the final stages of the Group II zonal competition involving teams from Asia and Oceania. Using the positions determined in their pools, the eighteen teams faced off to determine their placing in the 2020–21 Billie Jean King Cup Asia/Oceania Zone Group II. The top two teams advanced to Group I for 2022.

Pool results

Promotional play-offs 
The first-placed teams of each pool played against one another in a head-to-head round. The winners of each round advanced to the 2022 Asia/Oceania Zone Group I.

New Zealand vs. Philippines

3rd to 4th place play-offs
The second-placed teams of each pool played against one another in a head-to-head round to determine the 3rd and 4th placings.

Thailand vs. Pakistan

5th to 6th place play-offs
The third-placed teams of each pool played against one another in a head-to-head round to determine the 5th and 6th placings.

Guam vs. Mongolia

7th to 8th place play-offs
The second-placed teams of each pool played against one another in a head-to-head round to determine the 7th and 8th placings.

Singapore vs. Turkmenistan

Final placements 

  was promoted to Asia/Oceania Zone Group I in 2022.

References

External links 
 Billie Jean King Cup website

2020–21 Billie Jean King Cup Asia/Oceania Zone